Yeni yol may refer to:

 Yeni yol, Azerbaijan, a municipality
 New Way (Turkey), a political party

See also  
 Yeniyol (disambiguation)